Jason Boxhill (born 21 May 1983) is a Barbadian footballer who plays for Paradise FC and the Barbados national football team.

Career

International
Boxhill made his senior international debut on 11 January 2004, coming on as a 48th-minute substitute for Bernard Howell in a 2-0 friendly victory over Grenada.

Career statistics

International

References

External links

1983 births
Living people
Paradise FC (Barbados) players
Barbadian footballers
Barbados international footballers
Association football goalkeepers